Fanu is the alias of music DJ, producer, and label founder Janne Hatula (born October 8, 1980). Based in Helsinki, Finland, Hatula composes drum and bass and electronic music. He began producing music at the age of twelve as a hobby before issuing his first recording in 2003. Also makes hip hop as FatGyver. He has collaborated with producer and composer Bill Laswell and vocalist Gigi.

Discography
Daylightless (2007)
Lodge (2008)
Homefree (2009)
Serendipity (2011)
Selected Giveaway Goodies (2012)
Departure (2013)
Strange Lights (2015)
Polar (2015)
The Silent Watcher (2017)

References

External links

1980 births
Finnish DJs
Finnish electronic musicians
Living people
Electronic dance music DJs